Stenosomides was a formerly recognized genus of moths of the family Noctuidae; it is now considered a subgenus of Dichagyris.

Selected former species
 Stenosomides mansoura (Chrétien, 1911)
 Stenosomides spissilinea (Staudinger, 1896)
 Stenosomides sureyae (Draudt, 1938)

References
Natural History Museum Lepidoptera genus database
Stenosomides at funet

Noctuinae